Bad Karma may refer to:

 Bad Karma (1991 film)
 Bad Karma (2002 film)
 Bad Karma (EP), an extended play by Gabbie Hanna, or the title song
 "Bad Karma", a song by Warren Zevon from the 1987 album Sentimental Hygiene
 "Bad Karma", a 2014 song by Axel Thesleff
 Bad Karma (Elaeis guineensis), an epiallele in the genetics of the most common oilpalm

See also
 Karma (disambiguation)